Tykhon Cherniaiev (born March 1, 2010) is a Ukrainian chess prodigy.

Chess career 
Tykhon started playing chess at the age of 3.5 y.o.

Became the Ukrainian Chess Record holder at the age of 5 years, when he was able to fulfill the standard of the adult first rank in chess (Elo rating ≈ 1900).

At age of 6 years and 1 months Tykhon received all three FIDE ratings: Standard - 1603, Rapid - 1992, Blitz - 2009.

In February 2017, at age 6, Cherniaiev was featured on TV Channel Ukraine as he took part in a simultaneous exhibition game that ended 4–0 in his favor.

In September 2017, at age 7, he achieved a 50% score in the Ukrainian under-18 championship.

On May 28, 2018, at the age of 8 years 88 days, he became the youngest to defeat an international master in a standard tournament game. This occurred in round 9 at the Ukraine Clubs Teams Championship in Chornomorsk, Odessa Oblast, when Cherniaiev defeated IM Alexey Maly (rated FIDE 2355 at that time). The previous record, which was held by Awonder Liang, was broken by 30 days.

In June 2018, at age 8 years and 4 months, Cherniaiev participated in the 2018 FIDE World Cadet rapid and blitz chess championship held in Minsk. While he was qualified to compete in the under-8 section, he chose to compete in the under-10 section for both the rapid and blitz events. Cherniaiev started as the top seed by 235 rating points in the rapid under-10 section and by 223 rating points in the blitz under-10 section. He won both events as well as two FIDE-recognized "World Champion" titles.

From September 2016 to November 2018 Tykhon was assisted by grandmaster Alexander Goloshchapov.

From December 2018 to December 2019 Tykhon trained with coach IM Pavel Sevostianov.

In March 2019, at age 9 years, he received his first official FIDE title - Arena Grand Master.

In May 2019 Tykhon became the winner of the 11-th Ukrainian Award "Miracle Child 2019".

In August 2019 in Minsk (Belarus), at the age 9 years and 5 months, Tykhon Cherniaiev became a Vice World Champion in Rapid at the World Cadet Championships under-12 section.

From October 2019 to May 2020 Tykhon has been conducting joint streams with FM Mike Klein on the ChessKid.com.

In February 2020 in Kramatorsk (Ukraine), at the age 9 years and 11 months, Tykhon Cherniaiev became a Champion of Ukraine in Blitz at the Ukraine Chess Championship 2020, boys - U20.

In July 2021 in Kharkiv (Ukraine), at the age 11 years and 4 months, Tykhon Cherniaiev became a Champion of the Kharkiv region among men in Blitz.

In January 2022 he received his second official FIDE title - Candidate Master.

In July 2022 Cherniaiev participated in the 21st European Youth Rapid and Blitz Chess Championship, U12 held in Thessaloniki. Without losing a single game in two events, he became a two-time European Chess Champion in Rapid and Blitz.

In November 2022 Tykhon received his third FIDE title - FIDE Master.

Notable games 

In February 2018, at age 7 years and 11 months, Cherniaiev won a 3-minute game against FIDE master Eduard Miller (FIDE rating 2334) in 23 moves.

In June 2018, at age 8 years and 3 months, he defeated Grandmaster Francisco Vallejo Pons (FIDE rating 2713) in a 10-minute game.

In February 2019, at age 8 years and 11 months, he won an informal 12-game internet blitz match against Grandmaster Mikhail Golubev with a score of 6.5-5.5 (+5-4=3).

References

External links
 
 
 
 
 

Living people
2010 births
Ukrainian chess players
German chess players